Burkitt Nunatak is a small nunatak, rising to about  high, located in the north-west part of Dyer Plateau,  west-southwest of Crescent Scarp, Palmer Land, Antarctica. Following glaciological work by the British Antarctic Survey (BAS), 1980–81, the feature was named by the UK Antarctic Place-Names Committee after David M. Burkitt, a BAS general assistant who assisted in the work that season, and was a member of the Joint Services Expedition to Elephant Island, 1970–71.

References 

Nunataks of Palmer Land